Velvet Brown is a professor of tuba and euphonium at Pennsylvania State University. Prior to joining the faculty at Penn State in 2003, she taught at Bowling Green State University (Ohio) and Ball State University (Indiana), and served as an associate director of university bands at Boston University. Brown is currently a member of the International Tuba Euphonium Association Board of Directors and has served as the secretary of the executive committee for ITEA (2001–2007). She is also a founding board member of the International Women’s Brass Conference. Brown is noted for receiving the 1999–2000 William Fulbright Fellowship Vinciguerra Award. She has had many successful students who have won prestigious playing and teaching positions or become prizewinners at various regional, national and international competitions.

Velvet Brown also enjoys a professional career as an international soloist and chamber ensemble performer, recording artist, conductor and orchestral player. She has made regular appearances in Italy, Switzerland, Austria, Germany, Finland, France, England, Hungary,
Slovenia, Russia, Japan, Canada and the United States. Brown is the former principal tubist of the Altoona Symphony Orchestra and the New Hampshire Music Festival Orchestra. She has served as principal tuba with the River City Brass Band, and as substitute or additional tubist with the Detroit Symphony, Saint Louis Symphony, San Francisco Women’s Philharmonic, and the Fort Wayne Philharmonic. In 2004, Brown joined Howard Johnson’s “Gravity” Tuba Jazz Ensemble as lead tuba. She has also garnered high praise as a founding and current member of the Monarch Brass Quintet and Brass Ensemble, the Junction Tuba Quartet, and the Pennsylvania Brassworks (Faculty Brass at Penn State). She has released three solo CDs on the Crystal Records label and a CD for the Nicolai Music label. Velvet Brown can also be heard on Albany Records in her interpretation of John Williams’ Tuba Concerto. Her latest CD was released in August 2011. Velvet Brown is a Meinl Weston Performing Artist, performing on the MW 2250 and 2182 F tubas, and the MW 2000 C tuba.

Discography

Solo recordings
 1998 - Velvet Brown, Tuba (Crystal), tuba solo and piano
 2001 - Music for Velvet (Crystal), tuba solo and piano
 2005 - Perspectives in Rhythm (Crystal), tuba solo and percussion ensemble
 2011 - Simply Velvet (Potenza), tuba solo and piano

Other recordings
 2000 - Heart of a Wolf (Nicolai Music)
 Solo tuba and tuba/euphonium duet
 2003 - Monarch Brass (2003)
 Monarch Brass Ensemble and Brass Quintet
 2004 - New Music From Bowling Green, Vol. 3 (Albany)
Concerto for Tuba and Orchestra by John Williams with the Bowling Green Philharmonia

References

External links 
 

Boston University College of Fine Arts alumni
Living people
Pennsylvania State University faculty
American classical tubists
Women tubists
West Virginia University alumni
African-American musicians
Place of birth missing (living people)
21st-century tubists
Year of birth missing (living people)
Bowling Green State University faculty
21st-century African-American women
20th-century African-American women
20th-century African-American people
20th-century African-American musicians
21st-century African-American musicians
20th-century tubists